Zahra Muzdalifah (born 4 April 2001) is an Indonesian footballer who plays a forward for South Shields in the English FA Women's Division One and the Indonesia women's national team.

Early life
Zahra Muzdalifah was born in Jakarta, Indonesia on April 4, 2001. She started playing football from the age of 7, after her father introduced her to the sport.

Education 
She continued her education while playing professional football in Indonesia. She completed her SD, SMP, and SMA qualification in 10 years.  At the high school level, Zahra attended Islamic Secondary School International Middle School (IISS). Then proceed to the upper intermediate level at International Islamic High School. After completing her education at the senior secondary level, Zahra then continued her education at Binus University majoring in Mass Communication.

Career
She started her career in football by joining SSB Madani Meruya, she later joined SSB Patriot Merah Putih and then Zahra then joined ASIOP Football Academy in 2012.

At the age of 12, she joined ASIOP Football Academy, where she gained the skills to appear in the Women's football competition which took place in Norway. Muzdalifah was with the Ngapak FC futsal team and also the Jakarta 69 club.

Her career became increasingly recognised when she became part of the Persija Putri, where she scored 1 goal on her debut against PSIS Putri a 4-1 victory at Maguwoharjo Stadium, Sleman, in the event Liga 1 Putri, a top-flight women's football league in Indonesia.

Her performance attracted several clubs she defended, including an invitation to join the Indonesian team, Srikandi Garuda at the Asian Games in 2018. Not only as a player, but as a Team captain.

International goals
Scores and results list Indonesia's goal tally first.

References

External links

2001 births
Living people
Indonesian women's footballers
Women's association football forwards
Indonesia women's international footballers
Indonesian expatriate women's footballers
Sportspeople from Jakarta